Thomas Mark Strama, known as Mark Strama (born September 10, 1967), is an American businessman who is a Google executive, and a former Democratic member of the Texas House of Representatives, representing the 50th District from 2005 until 2013. He served as chairman of the House Committee on Technology, Economic Development & Workforce and on the House Committee on Energy Resources. Regarded by many as a rising star in the Democratic Party, he stunned the political world when he resigned from his seat in the Texas House to become the head of Google Fiber in Austin. Strama was also a major factor in the success of the world's only major public election ever held on the internet, the 2000 Arizona Democratic Primary.

Early life, education, and career 
Strama was born in Dallas, Texas, to Thomas and Brenda Victoria Trabulsi. He has one brother, Richard Keith Strama. He graduated in 1986 from Memorial High School in Hedwig Village near Houston. He earned an undergraduate degree in 1990 in both political science and philosophy from Brown University in Providence, Rhode Island.

Early political efforts 
After his graduation from Brown, Strama worked for the Ann Richards 1990 gubernatorial campaign against Clayton W. Williams Jr. He then worked as chief of staff to State Senator Rodney Ellis. During Strama's tenure, the magazine Texas Monthly named Senator Ellis one of the state's ten best legislators. In 1995, Strama began work on Rock the Vote which is credited with helping over one million people register to vote.

Private sector 
Strama returned to Austin to found NewVoter.com, the first company to register voters online. Working to bring the economy, efficiency, and convenience of new technology to the democratic process, Strama's company was acquired by New York-based Election.com in 2000, and helped over 700,000 Americans register to vote online in the 2000 election cycle. Strama was also considered a major factor in the success of the Arizona Democratic Party conducting their 2000 Presidential Primary over the internet He currently holds the franchise rights to the Sylvan Learning Centers in the Austin area.

Campaign Academy Program 
In 2004, Strama created a program to involve college students in politics. The Campaign Academy allows them to work for his campaign and in turn, Strama invites speakers to give their insights on politics to the participants. In 2008, the Campaign Academy was opened up to people of all ages, including a 10-year-old and a 50-year-old, among many high school and college students. Speakers at the Campaign Academy have included former Democratic National Chairman Howard Dean, Christine Pelosi, Admiral Bob Inman, Garry Mauro, and U.S. Representative Lloyd Doggett.

Personal life 
Strama speaks Spanish fluently. He married Austin television reporter Crystal Cotti soon after his 2004 election to office. Their first child, Victoria Rose Strama, was born in January 2007. They have since had two more daughters.

Texas Ten Best Legislators
During his five in the Texas state legislature, Texas Monthly magazine named Strama to its list of Texas's ten best legislators three times. He was widely respected.

External links

Texas House of Representatives - Mark Strama official TX House website
Mark Strama for State Representative 'campaign website
Project Vote Smart - Representative Mark Strama (TX) profileFollow the Money'' - Mark Strama
2006 2004 campaign contributions

References

1967 births
Living people
Memorial High School (Hedwig Village, Texas) alumni
Brown University alumni
Members of the Texas House of Representatives
People from Dallas
People from Houston
21st-century American politicians